Lac-Saint-Jean is a provincial electoral district in the Saguenay-Lac-Saint-Jean region of Quebec, Canada, that elects members to the National Assembly of Quebec. It notably includes the municipalities of Alma, Métabetchouan–Lac-à-la-Croix and Saint-Bruno.

It was created for the 1890 election.

In the change from the 2001 to the 2011 electoral map, it lost Saint-André-du-Lac-Saint-Jean and part of the unorganized territory of Passes-Dangereuses to Roberval electoral district.

It is named for Lac Saint-Jean.

Linguistic demographics
Francophone: 99.4%
Anglophone: 0.4%
Allophone: 0.2%
per cent mother tongue – single answers

Members of the Legislative Assembly / National Assembly

Election results

|-

|-
  
|Liberal
|Pierre Simard
|align="right"|7,825
|align="right"|29.94
|align="right"|

|-

|-

|}

|-

|-
  
|Liberal
|Yves Bolduc
|align="right"|9,165
|align="right"|28.85
|align="right"|

|-

|-

|}

|-

|-
  
|Liberal
|Benoît Harvey
|align="right"|7,405
|align="right"|26.17
|align="right"|

|-
|}

References

External links
Information
 Elections Quebec

Election results
 Election results (National Assembly)

Maps
 2011 map (PDF)
 2001 map (Flash)
2001–2011 changes (Flash)
1992–2001 changes (Flash)
 Electoral map of Saguenay–Lac-Saint-Jean region
 Quebec electoral map, 2011

Quebec provincial electoral districts
Alma, Quebec